Agonum galvestonicum is a species of ground beetle in the Platyninae subfamily that is endemic to the United States.

References

Beetles described in 1920
galvestonicum
Endemic fauna of the United States